Håndballklubben Herulf is a Norwegian handball club from Moss, founded on 6 September 1950.

The men's team currently plays in the First Division, the second tier of Norwegian handball. Notable players include Mats Fransson and Geir Erlandsen. The women's team plays in the Third Division. Their home arena is Mossehallen.

References

 Official site 

Norwegian handball clubs
Sport in Moss, Norway
1950 establishments in Norway
Handball clubs established in 1950